Haldane is a surname and a given name which may refer to:

People
 Clan Haldane, a Lowland Scottish clan

Surname
 A. R. B. Haldane (1900–1982), Scottish social historian and author
 Andrew "Ack-Ack" Haldane (1917–1944), U.S. Marine, World War II hero
 Andy Haldane (born 1967), English banking official
 Aylmer Haldane (1862–1950), British Army general
 Benjamin Haldane (1874–1941), Tsimshian professional photographer from Metlakatla, Alaska
 Bert Haldane (1871–1937), British silent film director
 Charlotte Haldane née Franken (1894–1969), British feminist writer; wife of J. B. S. Haldane
 Daniel Rutherford Haldane (1824–1887), Scottish physician; son of James Haldane (second marriage)
 Duncan Haldane (born 1951), British physicist, Princeton University professor and Nobel Prize laureate
 Elizabeth Sanderson Haldane (1862–1937), Scottish public figure, author, biographer, philosopher, suffragist, nursing administrator, social welfare worker and first female Justice of the Peace in Scotland; sister of John Scott, Richard and William Haldane
 George Haldane (1722–1759), British Army brigadier general, Governor of Jamaica and Member of Parliament
 Graeme Haldane (1897–1981), Scottish engineer
 James Haldane (disambiguation), multiple people
 J. B. S. Haldane (1892–1964), British geneticist and evolutionary biologist; son of John Scott Haldane and brother of Naomi Mitchison née Haldane
 John Joseph Haldane (born 1954), British philosopher
 John Scott Haldane (1860–1936), British physician; grandson of James Haldane, brother of Elizabeth, Richard and William Haldane, father of J. B. S. Haldane and Naomi Mitchison née Haldane
 Johnston Douglas Haldane (1926–2012), Scottish child psychiatrist and pioneer of Family therapy and Kirk elder
 Lewis Haldane (born 1985), Welsh footballer
 Mungo Haldane (c. 1682–1755), Scottish Member of Parliament
 Naomi Mitchison née Haldane (1897–1999), Scottish writer; daughter of John Scott Haldane and sister of J. B. S. Haldane
 Patrick Haldane of Gleneagles (–1769), Scottish classicist, advocate, and politician, joint Solicitor-General for Scotland 1746–55
 Richard Haldane, 1st Viscount Haldane (1856–1928), Lord Chancellor and 'Father of the Territorial Army'; grandson of James Haldane, brother of Elizabeth, John Scott and William Haldane
 Robert Haldane (1764–1842), Scottish churchman
 William Haldane (1864–1951), Crown Agent for Scotland; grandson of James Haldane, brother of Elizabeth, John Scott and Richard Haldane

Given name
 Haldane Douglas (1892–1980), American art director
 Haldane Duncan (born 1940), Scottish television producer and director
 Haldane Robert Mayer (born 1941), Senior United States Circuit Judge of the United States Court of Appeals for the Federal Circuit and law professor
 Haldane Stewart (1868–1942), English musician, composer and cricketer